Stacey Patton is an American journalist, writer, author, speaker, commentator, and college professor.

Patton has written for The Baltimore Sun, Al Jazeera, BBC America, The New York Times, The Washington Post, The Dallas Morning News, and The Root.

Patton, a former senior enterprise reporter for The Chronicle of Higher Education, was previously a professor of multimedia journalism at Morgan State University's School of Global Journalism and Communication and founder of the anti-child abuse movement Spare The Kids, Inc. She is now a research associate professor at Morgan State University and she teaches journalism at Howard University in Washington, DC.

In 2012, Womanspace of Mercer County, New Jersey, a nonprofit organization that provides help for victims and survivors of domestic and sexual violence, awarded its annual Barbara Boggs Sigmund Award to Patton. She has won reporting awards from the William Randolph Hearst Foundation, National Association of Black Journalists, the Scripps Howard Foundation, National Education Writers Association, and she was the 2015 recipient of the Vernon Jarrett Medal for her reporting on race.

Also in 2012, Patton published an article in The Chronicle of Higher Education challenging scholars and students in the fields of Black/African-American studies to address the "gap" of discussing taboo subjects – such as "black sexual agency, pleasure and intimacy, or same-sex relationships" – within the aforementioned fields. In 2017, the Black Studies Department at the University of Missouri dedicated its annual Black Studies Fall Conference to the discussions brought up in Patton's article.

Patton is also the author of the memoir That Mean Old Yesterday. The book was published by Simon & Schuster.

References

External links
Spare The Kids, Inc.

Living people
American women journalists
21st-century American memoirists
African-American writers
21st-century American women writers
American women memoirists
Year of birth missing (living people)
21st-century African-American women
21st-century African-American people